Aleksandrs Upmals (born 1 September 1892, date of death unknown) was a Latvian long-distance runner. He competed for the Russian Empire in the marathon at the 1912 Summer Olympics.

References

1892 births
Year of death missing
Athletes (track and field) at the 1912 Summer Olympics
Latvian male long-distance runners
Male long-distance runners from the Russian Empire
Latvian male marathon runners
Olympic competitors for the Russian Empire
Athletes from Riga
Male marathon runners from the Russian Empire